The McPherson Bulldogs are the athletic teams that represent McPherson College, located in McPherson, Kansas, in intercollegiate sports as a member of the National Association of Intercollegiate Athletics (NAIA), primarily competing in the Kansas Collegiate Athletic Conference (KCAC) since the 1902–03 academic year. Their athletic team colors are red and white, with black being used as a complementary color in logos and uniforms.

Varsity teams
McPherson competes in 18 intercollegiate varsity sports: Men's sports include baseball, basketball, cross country, football, soccer, tennis and track & field; while women's sports include basketball, cross country, soccer, softball, tennis, track & field and volleyball; and co-ed sports include competitive cheer, competitive dance and shotgun sports.

Football
Recent times has brought a level of success to the Bulldog football program.  The team completed the 2009 year with a record of 9 wins and 2 losses (8-1 in conference play) with a second-place finish in the conference and post-season playoff appearance for the first time.

School records of the program go back to 1920, but other records show a player named Pop Hollinger played football for McPherson in 1917 or earlier.  It is possible that records are incorrect, incomplete, or that there was no official coach before the 1920 season.

The first paid coach for the program that the school has on record was W. E. Daniel in 1920, who posted a record of 5–3–3.  Other coaches included Woody Woodard (1950–1952), Don Rominger (1973–1977), Dan Thiessen (1986–1992), and current head coach Pete Sterbick.

References

External links